James W. Naughton (1840–1898) was an American architect, serving as the Superintendent of Buildings for the Board of Education of the City of Brooklyn. He was born in Ireland and immigrated to the United States in 1848, at age eight. He worked as an apprentice in the office of J & A Douglas in Milwaukee, Wisconsin. He entered the University of Wisconsin to study architecture in 1859. He returned to Brooklyn, New York in 1861 and continued his studies at the Cooper Union.  He served as Superintendent of Buildings for the City of Brooklyn from 1874 to 1876. In 1879, he was appointed Superintendent of Buildings for the Board of Education of the City of Brooklyn, a position he held until his death in 1898. During this period he designed all the school buildings in the city of Brooklyn.

Selected works
Girls High School (1886), Brooklyn, New York
Boys High School (1891), Brooklyn, New York
Public School 108 (1895), Brooklyn, New York
Public School 9 Annex (1895), Brooklyn, New York

References

External links
 James W. Naughton, at New York Architecture Images
Brownstoner Blog: Walkabout with Montrose: Master of Schools, JW Naughton

Cooper Union alumni
Architects from New York (state)
1840 births
1898 deaths
19th-century American architects
Irish emigrants to the United States (before 1923)